RRP12-like protein is a protein that in humans is encoded by the RRP12 gene. It is currently thought to be involved in ribosome assembly of the precursor particles of both subunits in eukaryotes and was identified as a RNA binding protein.

References

Further reading